Nicolae Gheorghe Caranfil (also spelled Caramfil; 28 November 1893 – 22 April 1978) was a Romanian fencer. He competed in the team foil event at the 1928 Summer Olympics.

Born in Galați, he completed his secondary studies at the city's Vasile Alecsandri High School in 1911. He then went to Bucharest to study at the National School of Bridges and Roads, completing his civil engineering studies at the École de Génie Civil of Université de Gand in Belgium, followed by post-graduate studies at the University of Cambridge.

After returning to Romania, Caranfil was mobilized into the Army in 1916 as a second lieutenant and served in an artillery unit during World War I. From 1922 to 1929 he was director of the Electrica company, founded by fellow engineer Dimitrie Leonida.

From 13 November 1936 to 1 January 1937 Caranfil served as Minister of Air and Marine in the Third Tătărăscu cabinet. He was elected a corresponding member of the Romanian Academy in 1940. 

A street in Sector 1 of Bucharest is named after him.

References

External links
 

1893 births
1978 deaths
Sportspeople from Galați
Ghent University alumni
Romanian military personnel of World War I
Romanian male fencers
Romanian foil fencers
Olympic fencers of Romania
Fencers at the 1928 Summer Olympics
Members of the Romanian Cabinet
Romanian engineers
Corresponding members of the Romanian Academy
Romanian expatriates in the United States